The 2013 Denmark Super Series Premier is the ninth super series tournament of the 2013 BWF Super Series. The tournament was held in Odense, Denmark from October 15–20, 2013 and had a total purse of $400,000. A qualification was held to fill four places in three of the five disciplines of the main draws.

Men's singles

Seeds

Top half

Bottom half

Finals

Women's singles

Seeds

Top half

Bottom half

Finals

Men's doubles

Seeds

Top half

Bottom half

Finals

Women's doubles

Seeds

Top half

Bottom half

Finals

Mixed doubles

Seeds

Top half

Bottom half

Finals

References 

Indonesia Super Series Premier
2013 Indonesia Super Series
Denmark Super Series
Sport in Odense